James Davies Lewin (April 1, 1812 – March 11, 1900) was a Canadian office holder, businessman, and politician.

Background
Born in Womaston, Radnorshire (now Powys), Wales, the son of Samuel Lewin and Mary Furmage, Lewin was educated at the Kingston Grammar School, Wales.

Career
He entered the British government service in 1830 and assigned to the customs department on the Miramichi River, New Brunswick. He continued in the office for twenty years. In 1855, he was elected to the Presidency of the Bank of New Brunswick, and held this position until his death. He was appointed to the Senate on the advice of Alexander Mackenzie on November 10, 1876, representing the senatorial division of St. John (Lancaster), New Brunswick. A Liberal, he served for 23 years until his death in 1900.

Family life
He was married in 1832 to Sarah Ann Clarke, they had at least seven children.

References
 
 

1812 births
1900 deaths
Canadian senators from New Brunswick
Liberal Party of Canada senators
People from Powys
Welsh emigrants to pre-Confederation New Brunswick